Dharma in religious or philosophical sense can refer to:
 Dharma (Hinduism)
 Dharma (Buddhism)
 Dharma (Jainism)
 Sikh Dharma

Dharma may also refer to:

Entertainment
 Dharma (Merzbow album)
 Dharma (Sebastián Yatra album)
 Dharma (character), a fictional comic book character, leader of the comic book super-team Shadow Cabinet
 Dharma Finkelstein, the titular character in the American sitcom Dharma & Greg
 Dharma (1973 film), a 1973 Bollywood action film directed by Chand
 Dharma (1998 film), a 1998 Tamil action film directed by Keyaar
 Dharmaa, a 2010 Nepali film
 Dharma Productions, a Bollywood film company
 The Dharmas or Steadman, former British indie rock band

People
 Bodhidharma, 6th century Buddhist monk
 Buck Dharma (born 1947), guitarist
 Subhadrangi, mother of Ashoka
 Jahja Daniel Dharma (1911–1988), Indonesian naval officer
 Vikram Dharma (1961–2006), stunt director

Other uses
 Dharmanatha, 15th Jain Tirthankara
 Dharmathakur,  a deity worshipped by villagers in the traditional Rarh region in the present day Indian state of West Bengal
 Dharma doll, Japanese wish doll

See also
 Dharm (film), a 2007 Hindi-language Indian film directed by Bhavna Talwar